= Neil Swidey =

Neil Swidey has covered a broad array of topics for the Boston Globe since 1999. Swidey has also authored nonfiction books including Trapped Under the Sea, which reached number one on the Boston Globe's bestseller list in 2014 and was rated one of the year's best nonfiction books by Amazon. Swidey's first book, The Assist, was also a Boston Globe bestseller. He coauthored a New York Times bestseller entitled Last Lion: The Fall and Rise of Ted Kennedy. He has been an analyst for NBC News on matters having to do with former U.S. Senator Kennedy. Swidey currently teaches journalism at Brandeis University.
